Doreen Tess Waddell (10 July 1965 – 1 March 2002), also known by her stage name Do'reen, was a singer who worked with Soul II Soul, The KLF, T-Funk, and the Phunklawds.

Music career

Soul II Soul

Waddell sang lead vocals on Soul II Soul's "Feel Free" and "Happiness (Dub)", and backing vocals on other tracks, on the album Club Classics Vol. One.

KLF
She sang backing vocals on the KLF's "Justified and Ancient (All Bound for Mu Mu Land)".

D'Influence
Her solo career included a collaboration with D'Influence on "Ain't Gonna Walk In Your Shadow No More".

Death
Waddell was killed on 1 March 2002 in Shoreham-By-Sea.  After being challenged by staff in Tesco at the Holmbush Shopping Centre on suspicion of shoplifting goods, including children's items, she ran through a rear fire exit and attempted to cross the A27 nearby. She was hit by three vehicles, dying instantly at the age of 36. She left a four-year-old son.

References 

1965 births
2002 deaths
20th-century Black British women singers
Pedestrian road incident deaths
Road incident deaths in England
English people of Jamaican descent
Soul II Soul members